The National Democratic Alternative (NADA) is a national-conservative political coalition in Serbia, led by the New Democratic Party of Serbia (NDSS) and Movement for the Restoration of the Kingdom of Serbia (POKS).

History 
It was initially formed as a joint political platform between the two parties in January 2021, although in May, it was expanded into a political coalition. It is now made up of more than 20 citizens' associations.  Matija Bećković and Ljubinko Đurković expressed their support to the coalition. Its presidential candidate for the 2022 election was Miloš Jovanović, while its ballot carrier for the parliamentary election was retired general Božidar Delić.

On 28 January 2022, Together for Šumadija, a minor political party from Kragujevac, joined the coalition.

Political positions 
It opposes the legalization of the same sex civil unions, supports a proposal for the adoption of a declaration of support to Republika Srpska, and supports the restoration of the monarchy. In September 2021, they presented their program for the upcoming elections. They voiced their opposition to the 2022 constitutional referendum.

Members

Electoral performance

Parliamentary elections

Presidential elections

Belgrade City Assembly election

Local elections

References

2021 establishments in Serbia
Christian democratic parties in Europe
Conservative parties in Serbia
Eastern Orthodox political parties
Eurosceptic parties in Serbia
Monarchist parties in Serbia
National conservative parties
Political parties established in 2021
Political party alliances in Serbia